Unified Theories of Cognition is a 1990 book by Allen Newell. Newell argues for the need of a set of general assumptions for cognitive models that account for all of cognition: a unified theory of cognition,  or cognitive architecture. The research started by Newell on unified theories of cognition represents a crucial element of divergence with respect to the vision of his long-term collaborator, and AI pioneer, Herbert Simon  for what concerns the future of artificial intelligence research. Antonio Lieto recently drew attention to such a discrepancy, by pointing out that Herbert Simon decided to focus on the construction of single simulative programs  (or microtheories/"middle-range" theories) that were considered a sufficient mean to enable the generalisation of “unifying” theories of cognition  (i.e. according to Simon the "unification" was assumed to be derivable from a body of qualitative generalizations coming from the study of individual simulative programs). Newell, on the other hand, didn’t consider the construction of single simulative microtheories a sufficient mean to enable the generalisation of “unifying” theories of cognition and, in fact, started the enterprise of studying and developing integrated and multi-tasking intelligence via cognitive architectures that would have led to the development of the Soar.

Contents
Newell argues that the mind functions as a single system. He also claims the established cognitive models are vastly underdetermined by experimental data. By cognition, Newell means: 

 Problem solving, decision making, routine action
 Memory, learning, skill
 Perception, motor behavior
 Language
 Motivation, emotion
 Imagining, dreaming, daydreaming

After arguing in favor of the development of unified theories of cognition, Newell puts forward a list of constraints to any unified theory, in that a theory should explain how a mind does the following: 

 Behave flexibly as a function of the environment 
 Exhibit adaptive (rational, goal-oriented) behavior 
 Operate in real time 
 Operate in a rich, complex, detailed environment (Perceive an immense amount of changing detail; use vast amounts of knowledge; and control a motor system of many degrees of freedom) 
 Use symbols and abstractions 
 Use language, both natural and artificial 
 Learn from the environment and from experience 
 Acquire capabilities through development 
 Operate autonomously, but within a social community 
 Be self-aware and have a sense of self 
 Be realizable as a neural system 
 Be construable by an embryological growth process 
 Arise through evolution 

Newell's secondary task is to put forward the cognitive architecture Soar as an implementation of a UTC that meets the constraints above. Other efforts at unified theories of cognition cited in the book include ACT-R and the human processor model.

See also
Blue Brain Project
Cognitive architecture
Soar

References

Further reading
 Newell, A. (1994).Unified Theories of Cognition, Harvard University Press; Reprint edition, .
 Newell, A. (1973). "You can’t play 20 questions with nature and win: Projective comments on the papers of this symposium". In W. G. Chase (ed.), Visual Information Processing. New York: Academic Press. (Read article online.)

External links
 What is a unified theory of cognition?
 You can't play 20 questions with nature and win

Artificial intelligence publications
Cognitive science literature